Vincenzo Torregiani or Torreggiani (born in Budrio, active in Bologna 1742 - 1770) was an Italian painter.

Biography
He trained under Stefano Orlandi in Bologna. For a few years, he moved to Florence and Rome, where he completed some fresco and tempera. He contributed perspective paintings in the cloister of the Scuderia of San Michele in Bosco. His son Giuseppe, active in 1760, followed his father's profession.

References

1700s births
Year of death missing
18th-century Italian painters
Italian male painters
Painters from Bologna
18th-century Italian male artists